The 65th Annual Grammy Awards ceremony was a music awards ceremony held at the Crypto.com Arena in Los Angeles on February 5, 2023. It recognized the best recordings, compositions, and artists of the eligibility year – October 1, 2021 to September 30, 2022 – as determined by the members of National Academy of Recording Arts and Sciences. The nominations were announced on November 15, 2022. South African comedian Trevor Noah, who hosted the 63rd and 64th ceremonies, returned again.

Beyoncé received the most nominations (nine) and tied Maverick City Music for wins (four), followed by Kendrick Lamar with eight nominations and three wins, and Adele and Brandi Carlile with seven nominations each. With a career total of 88 nominations, Beyoncé tied with her husband Jay-Z as the most nominated artists in Grammy history. Bad Bunny's Un Verano Sin Ti (2022) became the first Spanish-language album to be nominated for Album of the Year.

With her win in the Best Dance/Electronic Album category, Beyoncé passed Hungarian-British conductor Georg Solti for the record of most Grammy awards in the ceremony's history, with 32. Harry Styles won Album of the Year for Harry's House, becoming the first male British solo artist to win since George Michael in 1989. Lizzo won Record of the Year for "About Damn Time", becoming the first black woman to win the award since Whitney Houston in 1994. Bonnie Raitt won Song of the Year for "Just Like That", becoming the first female solo songwriter to win since Amy Winehouse in 2008. Samara Joy won Best New Artist, becoming the second jazz artist to win the award and first since Esperanza Spalding in 2011.

With her win in the Best Audio Book, Narration & Storytelling Recording category, Viola Davis became the 18th person to win Emmy, Grammy, Oscar, and Tony awards in their entertainment career.

Background
For the 2023 ceremony, the academy announced several changes for different categories and eligibility rules:

Category changes
 Five categories – Best Alternative Music Performance, Best Americana Performance, Best Score Soundtrack for Video Games and Other Interactive Media, Best Spoken Word Poetry Album, and Songwriter of the Year, Non-Classical – were added.
 A Special Merit Award, Best Song for Social Change, was added. The award will be determined by a Blue Ribbon Committee and is destined to reward songs that "contain lyrical content that addresses a timely social issue and promotes understanding, peacebuilding and empathy".
 For the categories of Best Opera Recording and Best Classical Compendium, composers and librettists became eligible for the award.
 Best New Age Album was renamed Best New Age, Ambient or Chant Album.
 For Best Musical Theater Album, composers and lyricists of more than 50% of the score of a new recording became eligible for the award.
 Best Spoken Word Album was renamed Best Audio Book, Narration & Storytelling Recording. Spoken word poetry is no longer eligible for this award and is now recognized with the Best Spoken Word Poetry Album category.

Album eligibility
 In order to be eligible for consideration, albums must contain greater than 75% playing time of newly recorded music; the previous eligibility rule was 50%. This rule does not apply to the categories of Best Compilation Soundtrack, Best Historical Album, Best Immersive Audio Album, Best Recording Package, Best Special Package, and Best Album Notes.

Craft committees
 For three categories of the classical music field (Producer of the Year, Classical, Best Engineered Album, Classical and Best Contemporary Classical Composition) the nominations will be determined by specialized craft committees.

Performers

Premiere ceremony
The performers for the ceremony were announced on January 29, 2023.

Main ceremony 
The first wave of performers for the ceremony were announced on January 25, 2023, with Harry Styles confirmed a few days later. Performers for the In Memoriam segment were announced on February 1, 2023. The 50 Years of Hip Hop performance was announced on February 3.

Presenters

Premiere ceremony
 Randy Rainbow – host
 Babyface
 Domi and JD Beck
 Myles Frost
 Arturo O'Farrill
 Malcolm-Jamal Warner
 Jimmy Jam
 Judy Collins
 Amanda Gorman

Main ceremony
 Catherine Carlile – introduced Brandi Carlile
 Jennifer Lopez – presented Best Pop Vocal Album
 Viola Davis – presented Best R&B Song
 Shania Twain – presented Best Country Album
 Billy Crystal – introduced Stevie Wonder, Smokey Robinson and Chris Stapleton
 Smokey Robinson – presented Best Pop Duo/Group Performance
 Jayla Sullivan – introduced Lizzo
 SZA – presented Best Musica Urbana Album
 Kid Harpoon – introduced Harry Styles
 Cardi B – presented Best Rap Album
 Madonna – introduced Sam Smith and Kim Petras
 James Corden – presented Best Dance/Electronic Music Album
 LL Cool J – presented inaugural Dr. Dre Global Impact Award to Dr. Dre
 Dwayne Johnson – presented Best Pop Solo Performance
 Jill Biden – presented Best Song for Social Change and Song of the Year
 Chris Martin – presented Record of the Year
 Olivia Rodrigo – presented Best New Artist
 Trevor Noah – presented Album of the Year

Winners and nominees
The following are the winners and nominees of the 65th annual Grammy Awards. Winners appear first and highlighted in bold.

General field
Record of the Year
 "About Damn Time" – Lizzo
 Ricky Reed and Blake Slatkin, producers; Patrick Kehrier, Bill Malina and Manny Marroquin, engineers/mixers; Emerson Mancini, mastering engineer
 "Don't Shut Me Down" – ABBA
 Benny Andersson, producer; Benny Andersson and Bernard Löhr, engineers/mixers; Björn Engelmann, mastering engineer
 "Easy on Me" – Adele
 Greg Kurstin, producer; Julian Burg, Tom Elmhirst and Greg Kurstin, engineers/mixers; Randy Merrill, mastering engineer
 "Break My Soul" – Beyoncé
 Beyoncé, Terius "The-Dream" Gesteelde-Diamant, Jens Christian Isaksen and Christopher "Tricky" Stewart, producers; Brandon Harding, Chris McLaughlin and Stuart White, engineers/mixers; Colin Leonard, mastering engineer
 "Good Morning Gorgeous" – Mary J. Blige
 D'Mile and H.E.R., producers; Bryce Bordone, Şerban Ghenea and Pat Kelly, engineers/mixers
 "You and Me on the Rock" – Brandi Carlile featuring Lucius
 Dave Cobb and Shooter Jennings, producers; Brandon Bell, Tom Elmhirst and Michael Harris, engineers/mixers; Pete Lyman, mastering engineer
 "Woman" – Doja Cat
 Crate Classics, Linden Jay, Aynzli Jones and Yeti Beats, producers; Jesse Ray Ernster and Rian Lewis, engineers/mixers; Mike Bozzi, mastering engineer
 "Bad Habit" – Steve Lacy
 Steve Lacy, producer; Neal Pogue and Karl Wingate, engineers/mixers; Mike Bozzi, mastering engineer
 "The Heart Part 5" – Kendrick Lamar
 Beach Noise, producer; Beach Noise, Rob Bisel, Ray Charles Brown Jr., James Hunt, Johnny Kosich, Matt Schaeffer and Johnathan Turner, engineers/mixers; Emerson Mancini, mastering engineer
 "As It Was" – Harry Styles
 Tyler Johnson and Kid Harpoon, producers; Jeremy Hatcher and Spike Stent, engineers/mixers; Randy Merrill, mastering engineer

Album of the Year
 Harry's House – Harry Styles Tyler Johnson, Kid Harpoon and Sammy Witte, producers; Jeremy Hatcher, Oli Jacobs, Nick Lobel, Spike Stent and Sammy Witte, engineers/mixers; Amy Allen, Tobias Jesso Jr., Tyler Johnson, Kid Harpoon, Mitch Rowland, Harry Styles and Sammy Witte, songwriters; Randy Merrill, mastering engineer Voyage – ABBA
 Benny Andersson, producer; Benny Andersson and Bernard Löhr, engineers/mixers; Benny Andersson and Björn Ulvaeus, songwriters; Björn Engelmann, mastering engineer
 30 – Adele
 Shawn Everett, Ludwig Göransson, Inflo, Tobias Jesso Jr., Greg Kurstin, Max Martin, Joey Pecoraro and Shellback, producers; Julian Burg, Steve Churchyard, Tom Elmhirst, Shawn Everett, Şerban Ghenea, Sam Holland, Michael Ilbert, Inflo, Greg Kurstin, Riley Mackin and Lasse Mårtén, engineers/mixers; Adele Adkins, Ludwig Göransson, Dean Josiah Cover, Tobias Jesso Jr., Greg Kurstin, Max Martin and Shellback, songwriters; Randy Merrill, mastering engineer
 Un verano sin ti – Bad Bunny
 Rauw Alejandro, Buscabulla, Chencho Corleone, Jhay Cortez, Tony Dize, Bomba Estéreo and The Marías, featured artists; Demy and Clipz, Elikai, HAZE, La Paciencia, Cheo Legendary, MAG, MagicEnElBeat, Mora, Jota Rosa, Subelo Neo and Tainy, producers; Josh Gudwin and Roberto Rosado, engineers/mixers; Raul Alejandro Ocasio Ruiz, Benito Antonio Martinez Ocasio, Raquel Berrios, Joshua Conway, Mick Coogan, Orlando Javier Valle Vega, Jesus Nieves Cortes, Luis Del Valle, Marcos Masis, Gabriel Mora, Elena Rose, Liliana Margarita Saumet and Maria Zardoya, songwriters; Colin Leonard, mastering engineer
Renaissance – Beyoncé
 Beam, Grace Jones and Tems, featured artists; Jameil Aossey, Bah, Beam, Beyoncé, BloodPop, Boi-1da, Cadenza, Al Cres, Mike Dean, Honey Dijon, Kelman Duran, Harry Edwards, Terius "The-Dream" Gesteelde-Diamant, Ivor Guest, GuiltyBeatz, Hit-Boy, Jens Christian Isaksen, Leven Kali, Lil Ju, MeLo-X, No I.D., Nova Wav, Chris Penny, P2J, Rissi, S1a0, Raphael Saadiq, Neenyo, Skrillex, Luke Solomon, Christopher "Tricky" Stewart, Jahaan Sweet, Syd, Sevn Thomas, Sol Was and Stuart White, producers; Chi Coney, Russell Graham, Guiltybeatz, Brandon Harding, Hotae Alexander Jang, Chris McLaughlin, Delroy "Phatta" Pottinger, Andrea Roberts, Steve Rusch, Jabbar Stevens and Stuart White, engineers/mixers; Denisia "@Blu June" Andrews, Danielle Balbuena, Tyshane Thompson, Kevin Marquis Bellmon, Sydney Bennett, Beyoncé, Jerel Black, Michael Tucker, Atia Boggs p/k/a Ink, Dustin Bowie, David Debrandon Brown, S. Carter, Nija Charles, Sabrina Claudio, Solomon Fagenson Cole, Brittany "@Chi_Coney" Coney, Alexander Guy Cook, Levar Coppin, Almando Cresso, Mike Dean, Saliou Diagne, Darius Scott, Jocelyn Donald, Jordan Douglas, Aubrey Drake Graham, Kelman Duran, Terius "The-Dream" Gesteelde-Diamant, Dave Giles II, Derrick Carrington Gray, Nick Green, Larry Griffin Jr, Ronald Banful, Dave Hamelin, Aviel Calev Hirschfield, Chauncey Hollis, Jr., Ariowa Irosogie, Leven Kali, Ricky Lawson, Tizita Makuria, Julian Martrel Mason, Daniel Memmi, Cherdericka Nichols, Ernest "No I.D." Wilson, Temilade Openiyi, Patrick Paige II From The Internet, Jimi Stephen Payton, Christopher Lawrence Penny, Michael Pollack, Richard Isong, Honey Redmond, Derek Renfroe, Andrew Richardson, Morten Ristorp, Nile Rodgers, Oliver Rodigan, Freddie Ross, Raphael Saadiq, Matthew Samuels, Sean Seaton, Skrillex, Corece Smith, Luke Francis Matthew Solomon, Jabbar Stevens, Christopher A. Stewart, Jahaan Sweet, Rupert Thomas, Jr. and Jesse Wilson, songwriters; Colin Leonard, mastering engineer
 Good Morning Gorgeous – Mary J. Blige
 DJ Khaled, Dave East, Fabolous, Fivio Foreign, Griselda, H.E.R., Jadakiss, Moneybagg Yo, Ne-Yo, Anderson .Paak, Remy Ma and Usher, featured artists; Alissia, Tarik Azzouz, Bengineer, Blacka Din Me, Rogét Chahayed, Cool & Dre, Ben Billions, DJ Cassidy, DJ Khaled, D'Mile, Wonda, Bongo Bytheway, H.E.R., Hostile Beats, Eric Hudson, London on da Track, Leon Michels, Nova Wav, Anderson.Paak, Sl!Mwav, Streetrunner, Swizz Beatz and J. White Did It, producers; Derek Ali, Ben Chang, Luis Bordeaux, Bryce Bordone, Lauren D'Elia, Chris Galland, Şerban Ghenea, Akeel Henry, Jaycen Joshua, Pat Kelly, Jhair Lazo, Shamele Mackie, Manny Marroquin, Dave Medrano, Ari Morris, Parks, Juan Peña, Ben Sedano, Kev Spencer, Julio Ulloa and Jodie Grayson Williams, engineers/mixers; Alissia Beneviste, Denisia "Blu June" Andrews, Archer, Bianca Atterberry, Tarik Azzouz, Mary J. Blige, David Brewster, David Brown, Shawn Butler, Rogét Chahayed, Ant Clemons, Brittany "Chi" Coney, Kasseem Dean, Benjamin Diehl, DJ Cassidy, Jocelyn Donald, Jerry Duplessis, Uforo Ebong, Dernst Emile II, John Jackson, Adriana Flores, Gabriella Wilson, Shawn Hibbler, Charles A. Hinshaw, Jamie Hurton, Eric Hudson, Jason Phillips, Khaled Khaled, London Holmes, Andre "Dre" Christopher Lyon, Reminisce Mackie, Leon Michels, Jerome Monroe, Jr., Kim Owens, Brandon Anderson, Jeremie "Benny The Butcher" Pennick, Bryan Ponce, Demond "Conway The Machine" Price, Peter Skellern, Shaffer Smith, Nicholas Warwar, Deforrest Taylor, Tiara Thomas, Marcello "Cool" Valenzano, Alvin "Westside Gunn" Worthy, Anthony Jermaine White and Leon Youngblood, songwriters
 In These Silent Days – Brandi Carlile
 Lucius, featured artist; Dave Cobb and Shooter Jennings, producers; Brandon Bell, Dave Cobb, Tom Elmhirst, Michael Harris and Shooter Jennings, engineers/mixers; Brandi Carlile, Dave Cobb, Phil Hanseroth and Tim Hanseroth, songwriters; Pete Lyman, mastering engineer
 Music of the Spheres – Coldplay
 BTS, Jacob Collier, Selena Gomez and We Are KING, featured artists; Jacob Collier, Daniel Green, Oscar Holter, Jon Hopkins, Max Martin, Metro Boomin, Kang Hyo-Won, Bill Rahko, Bart Schoudel, Rik Simpson, Paris Strother and We Are KING, producers; Guy Berryman, Jonny Buckland, Will Champion, Jacob Collier, The Dream Team, Duncan Fuller, Şerban Ghenea, Daniel Green, John Hanes, Jon Hopkins, Michael Ilbert, Max Martin, Bill Rahko, Bart Schoudel, Rik Simpson and Paris Strother, engineers/mixers; Guy Berryman, Jonny Buckland, Denise Carite, Will Champion, Jacob Collier, Derek Dixie, Sam Falson, Stephen Fry, Daniel Green, Oscar Holter, Jon Hopkins, Jung Ho-Seok, Chris Martin, Max Martin, John Metcalfe, Leland Tyler Wayne, Bill Rahko, Kim Nam-Joon, Jesse Rogg, Davide Rossi, Rik Simpson, Amber Strother, Paris Strother, Min Yoon-Gi, Federico Vindver andOlivia Waithe, songwriters; Randy Merrill, mastering engineer
 Mr. Morale & the Big Steppers – Kendrick Lamar
 Baby Keem, Blxst, Sam Dew, Ghostface Killah, Beth Gibbons, Kodak Black, Tanna Leone, Taylour Paige, Amanda Reifer, Sampha and Summer Walker, featured artists; The Alchemist, Baby Keem, Craig Balmoris, Beach Noise, Bekon, Boi-1da, Cardo, Dahi, DJ Khalil, The Donuts, FnZ, Frano, Sergiu Gherman, Emile Haynie, J.LBS, Mario Luciano, Tyler Mehlenbacher, OKLAMA, Rascal, Sounwave, Jahaan Sweet, Tae Beast, Duval Timothy and Pharrell Williams, producers; Derek Ali, Matt Anthony, Beach Noise, Rob Bisel, David Bishop, Troy Bourgeois, Andrew Boyd, Ray Charles Brown Jr., Derek Garcia, Chad Gordon, James Hunt, Johnny Kosich, Manny Marroquin, Erwing Olivares, Raymond J Scavo III, Matt Schaeffer, Cyrus Taghipour, Johnathan Turner and Joe Visciano, engineers/mixers; Khalil Abdul-Rahman, Hykeem Carter, Craig Balmoris, Beach Noise, Daniel Tannenbaum, Daniel Tannenbaum, Stephen Lee Bruner, Matthew Burdette, Isaac John De Boni, Sam Dew, Anthony Dixson, Victor Ekpo, Sergiu Gherman, Dennis Coles, Beth Gibbons, Frano Huett, Stuart Johnson, Bill K. Kapri, Jake Kosich, Johnny Kosich, Daniel Krieger, Kendrick Lamar, Ronald LaTour, Mario Luciano, Daniel Alan Maman, Timothy Maxey, Tyler Mehlenbacher, Michael John Mulé, D. Natche, OKLAMA, Jason Pounds, Rascal, Amanda Reifer, Matthew Samuels, Avante Santana, Matt Schaeffer, Sampha Sisay, Mark Spears, Homer Steinweiss, Jahaan Akil Sweet, Donte Lamar Perkins, Duval Timothy, Summer Walker and Pharrell Williams, songwriters; Emerson Mancini, mastering engineer
 Special – Lizzo
 Benny Blanco, Quelle Chris, Daoud, Omer Fedi, ILYA, Kid Harpoon, Ian Kirkpatrick, Max Martin, Nate Mercereau, The Monsters & Strangerz, Phoelix, Ricky Reed, Mark Ronson, Blake Slatkin and Pop Wansel, producers; Benny Blanco, Bryce Bordone, Jeff Chestek, Jacob Ferguson, Şerban Ghenea, Jeremy Hatcher, Andrew Hey, Sam Holland, ILYA, Stefan Johnson, Jens Jungkurth, Patrick Kehrier, Ian Kirkpatrick, Damien Lewis, Bill Malina, Manny Marroquin and Ricky Reed, engineers/mixers; Amy Allen, Daoud Anthony, Jonathan Bellion, Benjamin Levin, Thomas Brenneck, Christian Devivo, Omer Fedi, Eric Frederic, Ilya Salmanzadeh, Melissa Jefferson, Jordan K Johnson, Stefan Johnson, Kid Harpoon, Ian Kirkpatrick, Savan Kotecha, Max Martin, Nate Mercereau, Leon Michels, Nick Movshon, Michael Neil, Michael Pollack, Mark Ronson, Blake Slatkin, Peter Svensson, Gavin Chris Tennille, Theron Makiel Thomas, Andrew Wansel and Emily Warren, songwriters; Emerson Mancini, mastering engineerSong of the Year "Just Like That" Bonnie Raitt, songwriter (Raitt) "ABCDEFU"
 Sara Davis, Gayle and Dave Pittenger, songwriters (Gayle)
 "About Damn Time"
 Lizzo, Eric Frederic, Blake Slatkin and Theron Makiel Thomas, songwriters (Lizzo)
 "All Too Well (10 Minute Version) (The Short Film)"
 Liz Rose and Taylor Swift, songwriters (Swift)
 "As It Was"
 Tyler Johnson, Kid Harpoon and Harry Styles, songwriters (Styles)
 "Bad Habit"
 Matthew Castellanos, Brittany Fousheé, Diana Gordon, John Carroll Kirby and Steve Lacy, songwriters (Lacy)
 "Break My Soul"
 Beyoncé, S. Carter, Terius "The-Dream" Gesteelde-Diamant and Christopher A. Stewart, songwriters (Beyoncé)
 "Easy on Me"
 Adele Adkins and Greg Kurstin, songwriters (Adele)
 "God Did"
 Tarik Azzouz, E. Blackmon, Khaled Khaled, F. LeBlanc, Shawn Carter, John Stephens, Dwayne Carter, William Roberts and Nicholas Warwar, songwriters (DJ Khaled Featuring Rick Ross, Lil Wayne, Jay-Z, John Legend and Fridayy)
 "The Heart Part 5"
 Jake Kosich, Johnny Kosich, Kendrick Lamar and Matt Schaeffer, songwriters (Lamar)Best New Artist Samara Joy Anitta
 Omar Apollo
 Domi and JD Beck
 Latto
 Måneskin
 Muni Long
 Tobe Nwigwe
 Molly Tuttle
 Wet Leg

PopBest Pop Solo Performance "Easy on Me" – Adele "Moscow Mule" – Bad Bunny
 "Woman" – Doja Cat
 "Bad Habit" – Steve Lacy
 "About Damn Time" – Lizzo
 "As It Was" – Harry StylesBest Pop Duo/Group Performance "Unholy" – Sam Smith and Kim Petras "Don't Shut Me Down" – ABBA
 "Bam Bam" – Camila Cabello featuring Ed Sheeran
 "My Universe" – Coldplay and BTS
 "I Like You (A Happier Song)" – Post Malone and Doja CatBest Traditional Pop Vocal Album Higher – Michael Bublé When Christmas Comes Around... – Kelly Clarkson
 I Dream of Christmas – Norah Jones
 Evergreen – Pentatonix
 Thank You – Diana RossBest Pop Vocal Album Harry's House – Harry Styles Voyage – ABBA
 30 – Adele
 Music of the Spheres – Coldplay
 Special – Lizzo

Dance/electronicBest Dance/Electronic Recording "Break My Soul" – Beyoncé Beyoncé, Terius "The-Dream" Gesteelde-Diamant, Jens Christian Isaksen and Christopher "Tricky" Stewart, producers; Stuart White, mixer "Rosewood" – Bonobo
 Simon Green, producer; Simon Green, mixer
 "Don't Forget My Love" – Diplo and Miguel
 Diplo and Maximilian Jaeger, producers; Luca Pretolesi, mixer
 "I'm Good (Blue)" – David Guetta and Bebe Rexha
 David Guetta and Timofey Reznikov, producers; David Guetta and Timofey Reznikov, mixers
 "Intimidated" – Kaytranada featuring H.E.R.
 H.E.R. and Kaytranada, producers; Kaytranada, mixer
"On My Knees" – Rüfüs Du Sol
 Jason Evigan and Rüfüs Du Sol, producers; Cassian Stewart-Kasimba, mixerBest Dance/Electronic Album Renaissance – Beyoncé Fragments – Bonobo
 Diplo – Diplo
 The Last Goodbye – Odesza
 Surrender – Rüfüs Du Sol

Contemporary instrumentalBest Contemporary Instrumental Album Empire Central – Snarky Puppy Between Dreaming and Joy – Jeff Coffin
 Not Tight – Domi and JD Beck
 Blooz – Grant Geissman
 Jacob's Ladder – Brad Mehldau

RockBest Rock Performance "Broken Horses" – Brandi Carlile "So Happy It Hurts" – Bryan Adams
 "Old Man" – Beck
 "Wild Child" – The Black Keys
 "Crawl!" – Idles
 "Patient Number 9" – Ozzy Osbourne featuring Jeff Beck
 "Holiday"– TurnstileBest Metal Performance "Degradation Rules" – Ozzy Osbourne featuring Tony Iommi "Call Me Little Sunshine" – Ghost
 "We'll Be Back" – Megadeth
 "Kill or Be Killed" – Muse
 "Blackout" – TurnstileBest Rock Song "Broken Horses" Brandi Carlile, Phil and Tim Hanseroth, songwriters (Brandi Carlile) "Black Summer"
 Flea, John Frusciante, Anthony Kiedis and Chad Smith, songwriters (Red Hot Chili Peppers)
"Blackout"
 Brady Ebert, Daniel Fang, Franz Lyons, Pat McCrory and Brendan Yates, songwriters (Turnstile)
"Harmonia's Dream"
 Robbie Bennett and Adam Granduciel, songwriters (The War On Drugs)
"Patient Number 9"
 John Osbourne, Chad Smith, Ali Tamposi, Robert Trujillo and Andrew Wotman, songwriters (Ozzy Osbourne featuring Jeff Beck)Best Rock Album Patient Number 9 – Ozzy Osbourne Dropout Boogie – The Black Keys
 The Boy Named If – Elvis Costello & The Imposters
 Crawler – Idles
 Mainstream Sellout – Machine Gun Kelly
 Lucifer on the Sofa – Spoon

AlternativeBest Alternative Music Performance "Chaise Longue" – Wet Leg "There'd Better Be a Mirrorball" – Arctic Monkeys
 "Certainty" – Big Thief
 "King" – Florence and the Machine
 "Spitting Off the Edge of the World" – Yeah Yeah Yeahs featuring Perfume GeniusBest Alternative Music Album Wet Leg – Wet Leg We – Arcade Fire
 Dragon New Warm Mountain I Believe in You – Big Thief
 Fossora – Björk
 Cool It Down – Yeah Yeah Yeahs

R&BBest R&B Performance "Hrs and Hrs" – Muni Long "Virgo's Groove" – Beyoncé
 "Here With Me" – Mary J. Blige featuring Anderson .Paak
 "Over" – Lucky Daye
 "Hurt Me So Good" – Jazmine SullivanBest Traditional R&B Performance "Plastic Off the Sofa" – Beyoncé "Do 4 Love" – Snoh Aalegra
 "Good Morning Gorgeous" – Mary J. Blige
 "Keeps on Fallin'" – Babyface featuring Ella Mai
 "'Round Midnight" – Adam Blackstone featuring Jazmine SullivanBest R&B Song "Cuff It" Denisia "Blu June" Andrews, Beyoncé, Mary Christine Brockert, Brittany "Chi" Coney, Terius "The-Dream" Gesteelde-Diamant, Morten Ristorp, Nile Rodgers and Raphael Saadiq, songwriters (Beyoncé)"Good Morning Gorgeous"
 Mary J. Blige, David Brown, Dernst Emile II, Gabriella Wilson and Tiara Thomas, songwriters (Mary J. Blige)
"Hrs and Hrs"
 Hamadi Aaabi, Dylan Graham, Priscilla Renea, Thaddis "Kuk" Harrell, Brandon John-Baptiste, Isaac Wriston and Justin Nathaniel Zim, songwriters (Muni Long)
"Hurt Me So Good"
 Akeel Henry, Michael Holmes, Luca Mauti, Jazmine Sullivan and Elliott Trent, songwriters (Jazmine Sullivan)
"Please Don't Walk Away"
 PJ Morton, songwriter (PJ Morton)Best Progressive R&B Album Gemini Rights – Steve Lacy Operation Funk – Cory Henry
 Drones – Terrace Martin
 Starfruit – Moonchild
 Red Balloon – Tank and the BangasBest R&B Album Black Radio III – Robert Glasper Good Morning Gorgeous (Deluxe) – Mary J. Blige
 Breezy (Deluxe) – Chris Brown
 Candydrip – Lucky Daye
 Watch the Sun – PJ Morton

RapBest Rap Performance "The Heart Part 5" – Kendrick Lamar "God Did" – DJ Khaled featuring Rick Ross, Lil Wayne, Jay-Z, John Legend and Fridayy
 "Vegas" – Doja Cat
 "Pushin P" – Gunna and Future featuring Young Thug
 "F.N.F. (Let's Go)" – Hitkidd and GloRillaBest Melodic Rap Performance "Wait for U" – Future featuring Drake and Tems "Beautiful" – DJ Khaled featuring Future and SZA
 "First Class" – Jack Harlow
 "Die Hard" – Kendrick Lamar featuring Blxst and Amanda Reifer
 "Big Energy (Live)" – LattoBest Rap Song "The Heart Part 5" Jake Kosich, Johnny Kosich, Kendrick Lamar and Matt Schaeffer, songwriters (Kendrick Lamar) "Churchill Downs"
 Ace G, BEDRM, Matthew Samuels, Tahrence Brown, Rogét Chahayed, Aubrey Graham, Jack Harlow and Jose Velazquez, songwriters (Jack Harlow featuring Drake)
 "God Did"
 Tarik Azzouz, E. Blackmon, Khaled Khaled, F. LeBlanc, Shawn Carter, John Stephens, Dwayne Carter, William Roberts and Nicholas Warwar, songwriters (DJ Khaled featuring Rick Ross, Lil Wayne, Jay-Z, John Legend and Fridayy)
 "Pushin P"
 Lucas Depante, Nayvadius Wilburn, Sergio Kitchens, Wesley Tyler Glass and Jeffery Lamar Williams, songwriters (Gunna and Future featuring Young Thug)
 "Wait for U"
 Tejiri Akpoghene, Floyd E. Bentley III, Jacob Canady, Isaac De Boni, Aubrey Graham, Israel Ayomide Fowobaje, Nayvadius Wilburn, Michael Mule, Oluwatoroti Oke and Temilade Openiyi, songwriters (Future featuring Drake and Tems)Best Rap Album Mr. Morale & the Big Steppers – Kendrick Lamar God Did – DJ Khaled
 I Never Liked You – Future
 Come Home the Kids Miss You – Jack Harlow
 It's Almost Dry – Pusha T

CountryBest Country Solo Performance "Live Forever" – Willie Nelson "Heartfirst" – Kelsea Ballerini
 "Something in the Orange" – Zach Bryan
 "In His Arms" – Miranda Lambert
 "Circles Around This Town" – Maren MorrisBest Country Duo/Group Performance "Never Wanted to Be That Girl"– Carly Pearce and Ashley McBryde "Wishful Drinking" – Ingrid Andress and Sam Hunt
 "Midnight Rider's Prayer" – Brothers Osborne
 "Outrunnin' Your Memory" – Luke Combs and Miranda Lambert
 "Does He Love You (Revisited)" – Reba McEntire and Dolly Parton
 "Going Where The Lonely Go" – Robert Plant and Alison KraussBest Country Song "'Til You Can't" Matt Rogers and Ben Stennis, songwriters (Cody Johnson) "Circles Around This Town"
 Ryan Hurd, Julia Michaels, Maren Morris and Jimmy Robbins, songwriters (Maren Morris)
 "Doin' This"
 Luke Combs, Drew Parker and Robert Williford, songwriters (Luke Combs)
 "I Bet You Think About Me (Taylor's Version) (From The Vault)"
 Lori McKenna and Taylor Swift, songwriters (Taylor Swift featuring Chris Stapleton)
 "If I Was a Cowboy"
 Jesse Frasure and Miranda Lambert, songwriters (Miranda Lambert)
 "I'll Love You Till The Day I Die"
 Rodney Crowell and Chris Stapleton, songwriters (Willie Nelson)Best Country Album A Beautiful Time – Willie Nelson Growin' Up – Luke Combs
 Palomino – Miranda Lambert
 Ashley McBryde Presents: Lindeville – Ashley McBryde
 Humble Quest – Maren Morris

New AgeBest New Age, Ambient or Chant Album Mystic Mirror – White Sun Positano Songs – Will Ackerman
 Joy – Paul Avgerinos
 Mantra Americana – Madi Das and Dave Stringer with Bhakti Without Borders
 The Passenger – Cheryl B. Engelhardt

JazzBest Improvised Jazz Solo "Endangered Species" – Wayne Shorter and Leo Genovese "Rounds (Live)" – Ambrose Akinmusire
 "Keep Holding On" – Gerald Albright
 "Falling" – Melissa Aldana
 "Call of the Drum" – Marcus Baylor
 "Cherokee/Koko" – John BeasleyBest Jazz Vocal Album Linger Awhile – Samara Joy The Evening: Live at Apparatus – The Baylor Project
 Fade to Black – Carmen Lundy
 Fifty – The Manhattan Transfer with The WDR Funkhausorchester
 Ghost Song – Cécile McLorin SalvantBest Jazz Instrumental Album New Standards Vol. 1 – Terri Lyne Carrington, Kris Davis, Linda May Han Oh, Nicholas Payton and Matthew Stevens Live in Italy – Peter Erskine Trio
 LongGone – Joshua Redman, Brad Mehldau, Christian McBride, and Brian Blade
 Live at the Detroit Jazz Festival – Wayne Shorter, Terri Lyne Carrington, Leo Genovese and Esperanza Spalding
 Parallel Motion – YellowjacketsBest Large Jazz Ensemble Album Generation Gap Jazz Orchestra – Steven Feifke, Bijon Watson, Generation Gap Jazz Orchestra Bird Lives – John Beasley, Magnus Lindgren and SWR Big Band
 Remembering Bob Freedman – Ron Carter and The Jazzaar Festival Big Band directed by Christian Jacob
 Center Stage – Steve Gadd, Eddie Gómez, Ronnie Cuber and WDR Big Band conducted by Michael Abene
 Architecture of Storms – Remy Le Boeuf's Assembly of ShadowsBest Latin Jazz Album Fandango at the Wall in New York – Arturo O'Farrill and The Afro Latin Jazz Orchestra featuring The Congra Patria Son Jarocho Collective Crisálida – Danilo Pérez featuring The Global Messengers
 If You Will – Flora Purim
 Rhythm & Soul – Arturo Sandoval
 Música de las Américas – Miguel Zenón

Gospel/contemporary ChristianBest Gospel Performance/Song "Kingdom" – Maverick City Music and Kirk Franklin Kirk Franklin, Jonathan Jay, Chandler Moore and Jacob Poole, songwriters "Positive" – Erica Campbell
 Erica Campbell, Warryn Campbell and Juan Winans, songwriters
 "When I Pray" – DOE
 Dominique Jones and Dewitt Jones, songwriters
 "The Better Benediction" – PJ Morton featuring Zacardi Cortez, Gene Moore, Samoht, Tim Rogers and Darrel Walls
 PJ Morton, songwriter
 "Get Up" – Tye Tribbett
 Brandon Jones, Christopher Michael Stevens, Thaddaeus Tribbett and Tye Tribbett, songwritersBest Contemporary Christian Music Performance/Song "Fear Is Not My Future" – Maverick City Music and Kirk Franklin Kirk Franklin, Nicole Hannel, Jonathan Jay, Brandon Lake and Hannah Shackelford, songwriters "God Really Loves Us (Radio Version)" – Crowder featuring Dante Bowe and Maverick City Music
 Dante Bowe, David Crowder, Ben Glover and Jeff Sojka, songwriters
 "So Good" – DOE
 Chuck Butler, Dominique Jones and Ethan Hulse, songwriters
 "For God Is with Us" – For King & Country and Hillary Scott
 Josh Kerr, Jordan Reynolds, Joel Smallbone and Luke Smallbone, songwriters
 "Holy Forever" – Chris Tomlin
 Jason Ingram, Brian Johnson, Jenn Johnson, Chris Tomlin and Phil Wickham, songwriters
 "Hymn of Heaven (Radio Version)" – Phil Wickham
 Chris Davenport, Bill Johnson, Brian Johnson and Phil Wickham, songwritersBest Gospel Album Kingdom Book One Deluxe – Maverick City Music and Kirk Franklin Die To Live – Maranda Curtis
 Breakthrough: The Exodus (Live) – Ricky Dillard
 Clarity – DOE
 All Things New – Tye TribbettBest Contemporary Christian Music Album Breathe – Maverick City Music Lion – Elevation Worship
 Life After Death – TobyMac
 Always – Chris Tomlin
 My Jesus – Anne WilsonBest Roots Gospel Album The Urban Hymnal – Tennessee State University Marching Band Let's Just Praise the Lord – Gaither Vocal Band
 Confessio – Irish American Roots – Keith & Kristyn Getty
 The Willie Nelson Family – Willie Nelson
 2:22 – Karen Peck and New River

LatinBest Latin Pop Album Pasieros – Rubén Blades and Boca Livre Aguilera – Christina Aguilera
 De adentro pa afuera – Camilo
 Viajante – Fonseca
 Dharma + – Sebastián YatraBest Música Urbana Album Un verano sin ti – Bad Bunny Trap Cake, Vol. 2 – Rauw Alejandro
 Legendaddy – Daddy Yankee
 La 167 – Farruko
 The Love & Sex Tape – MalumaBest Latin Rock or Alternative Album Motomami – Rosalía El alimento – Cimafunk
 Tinta y tiempo – Jorge Drexler
 1940 Carmen – Mon Laferte
 Alegoría – Gaby Moreno
 Los años salvajes – Fito PáezBest Regional Mexican Music Album (Including Tejano) Un canto por México – El musical – Natalia Lafourcade Abeja reina – Chiquis
 La reunión (Deluxe) – Los Tigres del Norte
 EP #1 Forajido – Christian Nodal
 Qué ganas de verte (Deluxe) – Marco Antonio SolísBest Tropical Latin Album Pa'llá voy – Marc Anthony Quiero verte feliz – La Santa Cecilia
 Lado A lado B – Víctor Manuelle
 Legendario – Tito Nieves
 Imágenes latinas – Spanish Harlem Orchestra
 Cumbiana II – Carlos Vives

American rootsBest American Roots Performance "Stompin' Ground" – Aaron Neville with The Dirty Dozen Brass Band "Someday It'll All Make Sense (Bluegrass Version)" – Bill Anderson featuring Dolly Parton
 "Life According to Raechel" – Madison Cunningham
 "Oh Betty" – Fantastic Negrito
 "Prodigal Daughter" – Aoife O'Donovan and Allison RussellBest Americana Performance "Made Up Mind" – Bonnie Raitt "Silver Moon [A Tribute to Michael Nesmith]" – Eric Alexandrakis
 "There You Go Again" – Asleep at the Wheel featuring Lyle Lovett
 "The Message" – Blind Boys of Alabama featuring Black Violin
 "You And Me on the Rock" – Brandi Carlile featuring LuciusBest American Roots Song "Just Like That" Bonnie Raitt, songwriter (Raitt) "Bright Star"
 Anaïs Mitchell, songwriter (Mitchell)
 "Forever"
 Sheryl Crow and Jeff Trott, songwriters (Sheryl Crow)
 "High and Lonesome"
 T Bone Burnett and Robert Plant, songwriters (Robert Plant and Alison Krauss)
 "Prodigal Daughter"
 Tim O'Brien and Aoife O'Donovan, songwriters (Aoife O'Donovan and Allison Russell)
 "You And Me on the Rock"
 Brandi Carlile, Phil Hanseroth and Tim Hanseroth, songwriters (Brandi Carlile featuring Lucius)Best Americana Album In These Silent Days – Brandi Carlile Things Happen That Way – Dr. John
 Good to Be... – Keb' Mo'
 Raise the Roof – Robert Plant and Alison Krauss
 Just Like That... – Bonnie RaittBest Bluegrass Album Crooked Tree – Molly Tuttle and Golden Highway Toward the Fray – The Infamous Stringdusters
 Almost Proud – The Del McCoury Band
 Calling You from My Mountain – Peter Rowan
 Get Yourself Outside – Yonder Mountain String BandBest Traditional Blues Album Get On Board – Taj Mahal and Ry Cooder Heavy Load Blues – Gov't Mule
 The Blues Don't Lie – Buddy Guy
 The Sun Is Shining Down – John Mayall
 Mississippi Son – Charlie MusselwhiteBest Contemporary Blues Album Brother Johnny – Edgar Winter Done Come Too Far – Shemekia Copeland
 Crown – Eric Gales
 Bloodline Maintenance – Ben Harper
 Set Sail – North Mississippi AllstarsBest Folk Album Revealer – Madison Cunningham Spellbound – Judy Collins
 The Light at the End of the Line – Janis Ian
 Age of Apathy – Aoife O'Donovan
 Hell on Church Street – Punch BrothersBest Regional Roots Music Album Live at the 2022 New Orleans Jazz & Heritage Festival – Ranky Tanky
 Full Circle – Sean Ardoin and Kreole Rock and Soul featuring LSU Golden Band from Tigerland
 Natalie Noelani – Natalie Ai Kamauu
 Halau Hula Keali'i O Nalani - Live at the Getty Center – Halau Hula Keali'i O Nalani
 Lucky Man – Nathan & The Zydeco Cha Chas

Reggae
Best Reggae Album
 The Kalling – Kabaka Pyramid Gifted – Koffee
 Scorcha – Sean Paul
 Third Time's the Charm – Protoje
 Com Fly Wid Mi – Shaggy

GlobalBest Global Music Performance "Bayethe" – Wouter Kellerman, Zakes Bantwini and Nomcebo Zikode "Udhero Na" – Arooj Aftab and Anoushka Shankar
 "Gimme Love" – Matt B and Eddy Kenzo
 "Last Last" – Burna Boy
 "Neva Bow Down" – Rocky Dawuni featuring Blvk H3roBest Global Music Album Sakura – Masa Takumi Shuruaat – Berklee Indian Ensemble
 Love, Damini – Burna Boy
 Queen of Sheba – Angélique Kidjo and Ibrahim Maalouf
 Between Us... (Live) – Anoushka Shankar, Metropole Orkest and Jules Buckley featuring Manu Delago

Children'sBest Children's Album The Movement – Alphabet Rockers Ready Set Go! – Divinity Roxx
 Space Cadet – Justin Roberts
 Los Fabulosos – Lucky Diaz and the Family Jam Band
 Into the Little Blue House – Wendy and DB

Spoken wordBest Audio Book, Narration & Storytelling Recording Finding Me – Viola Davis
 Act Like You Got Some Sense – Jamie Foxx
 Aristotle and Dante Dive into the Waters of the World – Lin-Manuel Miranda
 All About Me!: My Remarkable Life in Show Business – Mel Brooks
 Music Is History – Questlove

Best Spoken Word Poetry Album
 The Poet Who Sat by the Door – J. Ivy Black Men Are Precious – Ethelbert Miller
 Call Us What We Carry: Poems – Amanda Gorman
 Hiding in Plain View – Malcolm-Jamal Warner
 You Will Be Someone's Ancestor. Act Accordingly. – Amir Sulaiman

ComedyBest Comedy Album The Closer – Dave Chappelle
 Comedy Monster – Jim Gaffigan
 A Little Brains, A Little Talent – Randy Rainbow
 Sorry – Louis C.K.
 We All Scream – Patton Oswalt

Musical theater
Best Musical Theater Album
 Into The Woods (2022 Broadway Cast Recording) – Sara Bareilles, Brian D'Arcy James, Patina Miller and Phillipa Soo, principal soloists; Rob Berman and Sean Patrick Flahaven, producers; Stephen Sondheim, composer/lyricist (2022 Broadway Cast) Caroline, or Change – John Cariani, Sharon D. Clarke, Caissie Levy and Samantha Williams, principal soloists; Van Dean, Nicel Lilley, Lawrence Manchester, Elliott Scheiner and Jeanine Tesori, producers; Jeanine Tesori, composers; Tony Kushner, lyricists (New Broadway Cast)
 MJ The Musical – Myles Frost and Tavon Olds-Sample, principal soloists; David Holcenberg, Derik Lee and Jason Michael Webb, producers (Original Broadway Cast)
 Mr. Saturday Night – Shoshana Bean, Billy Crystal, Randy Graff and David Paymer, principal soloists; Jason Robert Brown, Sean Patrick Flahaven and Jeffrey Lesser, producers; Jason Robert Brown, composer; Amanda Green, lyricist (Original Broadway Cast)
 Six: Live on Opening Night – Joe Beighton, Tom Curran, Sam Featherstone, Paul Gatehouse, Toby Marlow and Lucy Moss, producers; Toby Marlow and Lucy Moss, composers/lyricists (Original Broadway Cast)
 A Strange Loop – Jaquel Spivey, principal soloist; Michael Croiter, Michael R. Jackson, Charlie Rosen and Rona Siddiqui, producers; Michael R. Jackson, composer/lyricist (Original Broadway Cast)

Visual mediaBest Compilation Soundtrack for Visual Media Encanto – Various Artists Elvis – Various Artists
 Stranger Things: Music from the Netflix Original Series, Season 4 (Vol. 2) – Various Artists
 Top Gun: Maverick – Lorne Balfe, Harold Faltermeyer, Lady Gaga and Hans Zimmer
 West Side Story – Various ArtistsBest Score Soundtrack for Visual Media Encanto – Germaine Franco No Time to Die – Hans Zimmer
 The Power of the Dog – Jonny Greenwood
 The Batman – Michael Giacchino
 Succession: Season 3 – Nicholas BritellBest Score Soundtrack for Video Games and Other Interactive Media Assassin's Creed Valhalla: Dawn of Ragnarök – Stephanie Economou Aliens: Fireteam Elite – Austin Wintory
 Call of Duty: Vanguard – Bear McCreary
 Old World – Christopher Tin
 Marvel's Guardians of the Galaxy – Richard JacquesBest Song Written for Visual Media "We Don't Talk About Bruno" (from Encanto) Lin-Manuel Miranda, songwriter (Carolina Gaitán - La Gaita, Mauro Castillo, Adassa, Rhenzy Feliz, Diane Guerrero, Stephanie Beatriz and Encanto Cast) "Be Alive" (from King Richard)
 Beyoncé and Darius Scott, songwriters (Beyoncé)
 "Carolina" (from Where the Crawdads Sing)
 Taylor Swift, songwriter (Swift)
 "Hold My Hand" (from Top Gun: Maverick)
 BloodPop and Lady Gaga, songwriters (Lady Gaga)
 "Keep Rising" (from The Woman King)
 Angelique Kidjo, Jeremy Lutito and Jessy Wilson, songwriters (Jessy Wilson featuring Angelique Kidjo)
 "Nobody Like U" (from Turning Red)
 Billie Eilish and Finneas O'Connell, songwriters (4*Town, Jordan Fisher, Finneas O'Connell, Josh Levi, Topher Ngo, Grayson Villanueva)

Composition and arrangementBest Instrumental Composition "Refuge" Geoffrey Keezer, composer (Geoffrey Keezer) "African Tales"
 Paquito D'Rivera, composer (Tasha Warren and Dave Eggar)
 "El País Invisible"
 Miguel Zenón, composer (Miguel Zenón, José Antonio Zayas Cabán, Ryan Smith and Casey Rafn)
 "Fronteras (Borders) Suite: Al-Musafir Blues"
 Danilo Pérez, composer (Danilo Pérez featuring The Global Messengers)
 "Snapshots"
 Pascal Le Boeuf, composer (Tasha Warren and Dave Eggar)Best Arrangement, Instrumental or A Cappella "Scrapple From The Apple" John Beasley, arranger (Magnus Lindgren, John Beasly & The SWR Big Band Featuring Martin Auer) "As Days Go By (An Arrangement of The Family Matters Theme Song)"
 Armand Hutton, arranger (Armand Hutton Featuring Terrell Hunt and Just 6)
 "How Deep Is Your Love"
 Matt Cusson, arranger (Kings Return)
 "Main Titles (Doctor Strange in the Multiverse of Madness)"
 Danny Elfman, arranger (Danny Elfman)
 "Minnesota, WI"
 Remy Le Boeuf, arranger (Remy Le Boeuf)Best Arrangement, Instruments and Vocals "Songbird (Orchestral Version)" Vince Mendoza, arranger (Christine McVie) "Let It Happen"
 Louis Cole, arranger (Louis Cole)
 "Never Gonna Be Alone"
 Jacob Collier, arranger (Jacob Collier featuring Lizzy McAlpine and John Mayer)
 "Optimistic Voices / No Love Dying"
 Cécile McLorin Salvant, arranger (Cécile McLorin Salvant)
 "2 + 2 = 5 (Arr. Nathan Schram)"
 Nathan Schram and Becca Stevens, arrangers (Becca Stevens and Attacca Quartet)

Package, notes and historicalBest Recording Package Beginningless Beginning
 Chun-Tien Hsia and Qing-Yang Xiao, art directors (Tamsui-Kavalan Chinese Orchestra)
 Divers
 William Stichter, art director (Soporus)
 Everything Was Beautiful
 Mark Farrow, art director (Spiritualized)
 Telos
 Ming Liu, art director (Fann)
 Voyeurist
 Tnsn Dvsn, art director (Underoath)

Best Boxed or Special Limited Edition Package
 In and Out of the Garden: Madison Square Garden '81, '82, '83
 Lisa Glines, Doran Tyson and Dave Van Patten, art directors (Grateful Dead)
 Artists Inspired By Music: Interscope Reimagined
 Josh Abraham, Steve Berman, Jimmy Iovine, John Janick and Jason Sangerman, art directors (Various Artists)
 Big Mess
 Berit Gwendolyn Gilma, art director (Danny Elfman)
 Black Pumas (Collector's Edition Box Set)
 Jenna Krackenberger, Anna McCaleb and Preacher, art directors (Black Pumas)
 Book
 Paul Sahre, art director (They Might Be Giants)

Best Album Notes
 Yankee Hotel Foxtrot (20th Anniversary Super Deluxe Edition)
 Bob Mehr, album notes writer (Wilco)
 The American Clavé Recordings
 Fernando González, album notes writer (Astor Piazzolla)
 Andy Irvine and Paul Brady
 Gareth Murphy, album notes writer (Andy Irvine and Paul Brady)
 Harry Partch, 1942
 John Schneider, album notes writer (Harry Partch)
 Life's Work: A Retrospective
 Ted Olson, album notes writer (Doc Watson)

Best Historical Album
 Yankee Hotel Foxtrot (20th Anniversary Super Deluxe Edition)
 Cheryl Pawelski and Jeff Tweedy, compilation producers; Bob Ludwig, mastering engineer (Wilco)
 Against The Odds: 1974-1982
 Tommy Manzi, Steve Rosenthal and Ken Shipley, compilation producers; Michael Graves, mastering engineer; Tom Camuso, restoration engineer (Blondie)
 The Goldberg Variations - The Complete Unreleased 1981 Studio Sessions
 Robert Russ, compilation producer; Martin Kistner, mastering engineer (Glenn Gould)
 Life's Work: A Retrospective
 Scott Billington, Ted Olson and Mason Williams, compilation producers; Paul Blakemore, mastering engineer (Doc Watson)
 To Whom It May Concern...
 Jonathan Sklute, compilation producer; Kevin Marques Moo, mastering engineer; Lucas MacFadden, restoration engineer (Freestyle Fellowship)

Production
Best Engineered Album, Non-Classical
 Harry's House
 Jeremy Hatcher, Oli Jacobs, Nick Lobel, Spike Stent and Sammy Witte, engineers; Randy Merrill, mastering engineer (Harry Styles)
 Adolescence
 Yonatan (Yoni) Ayal, Maxwell Byrne, Patrick Liney, Tim Nelson, Jock Nowell-Usticke, Aidan Peterson, Pierre Luc Rioux, Ike Schultz, Rutger Van Woudenberg, George Nicholas and Ryan Schwabe, engineers; Ryan Schwabe, mastering engineer (Baynk)
 Black Radio III
 Daniel Farris, Tiffany Gouché, Keith Lewis, Musiq Soulchild, Reginald Nicholas, Q-Tip, Amir Sulaiman, Michael Law Thomas and Jon Zacks, engineers; Chris Athens, mastering engineer (Robert Glasper)
 Chloë and the Next 20th Century
 Dave Cerminara and Jonathan Wilson, engineers; Adam Ayan, mastering engineer (Father John Misty)
 Wet Leg
 Jon McMullen, Joshua Mobaraki, Alan Moulder and Alexis Smith, engineers; Matt Colton, mastering engineer (Wet Leg)

Producer of the Year, Non-Classical
 Jack Antonoff
 "All Too Well (10 Minute Version) (Taylor's Version) (From The Vault)" (Taylor Swift) (T)
 Dance Fever (Florence + The Machine) (A)
 "I Still Believe" (Diana Ross) (T)
 Minions: The Rise Of Gru (Various Artists) (A)
 "Part of the Band" (The 1975) (S)
 Dan Auerbach
 Dropout Boogie (The Black Keys) (A)
 "El Bueno Y El Malo" (Hermanos Gutiérrez) (T)
 Nightmare Daydream (The Velveteers) (A)
 Rich White Honky Blues (Hank Williams Jr.) (A)
 Something Borrowed, Something New: A Tribute to John Anderson (Various Artists) (A)
 Strange Time to Be Alive (Early James) (A)
 Sweet Unknown (Ceramic Animal) (A)
 "Tres Hermanos" (Hermanos Gutiérrez) (T)
 Young Blood (Marcus King) (A)
 Boi-1da
 "Chronicles" (Cordae featuring H.E.R. and Lil Durk) (T)
 "Churchill Downs" (Jack Harlow featuring Drake) (T)
 "Heated" (Beyoncé) (T)
 "Mafia" (Travis Scott) (S)
 "N95" (Kendrick Lamar) (T)
 "Nail Tech" (Jack Harlow) (T)
 "Not Another Love Song" (Ella Mai) (T)
 "Scarred" (Giveon) (T)
 "Silent Hill" (Kendrick Lamar) (T)
 Dahi
 "Buttons" (Steve Lacy) (T)
 "Count Me Out" (Kendrick Lamar) (T)
 "Die Hard" (Kendrick Lamar) (T)
 "DJ Quik" (Vince Staples) (T)
 "Father Time" (Kendrick Lamar featuring Sampha) (T)
 "Give You the World" (Steve Lacy) (T)
 "Mercury" (Steve Lacy) (T)
 "Mirror" (Kendrick Lamar) (T)
 "Rich Spirit" (Kendrick Lamar) (T)
 Dernst "D'Mile" Emile II
 Candy Drip (Lucky Daye) (A)
 An Evening with Silk Sonic (Bruno Mars, Anderson .Paak and Silk Sonic) (A)
 Good Morning Gorgeous (Mary J. Blige) (S)
 "Sometimes I Feel Like a Motherless Child" (Jazmine Sullivan) (S)

Best Remixed Recording, Non-Classical
 "About Damn Time" (Purple Disco Machine Remix)
 Purple Disco Machine, remixer (Lizzo)
 "Break My Soul" (Terry Hunter Remix)
 Terry Hunter, remixer (Beyoncé)
 "Easy Lover" (Four Tet Remix)
 Four Tet, remixer (Ellie Goulding)
 "Slow Song" (Paul Woolford Remix)
 Paul Woolford, remixer (The Knocks and Dragonette)
 "Too Late Now" (Soulwax Remix)
 Soulwax, remixer (Wet Leg)

Best Immersive Audio Album
 Divine Tides
 Eric Schilling, immersive mix engineer; Stewart Copeland, Ricky Kej and Herbert Waltl, immersive producers (Stewart Copeland and Ricky Kej)
 Aguilera
 Jaycen Joshua, immersive mix engineer; Jaycen Joshua, immersive mastering engineer (Christina Aguilera)
 Memories...Do Not Open
 Mike Piacentini, immersive mix engineer; Mike Piacentini, immersive mastering engineer; Adam Alpert, Alex Pall, Jordan Stilwell and Andrew Taggart, immersive producers (The Chainsmokers)
 Picturing the Invisible - Focus 1
 Jim Anderson, immersive mix engineer; Morten Lindberg and Ulrike Schwarz, immersive mastering engineers; Jane Ira Bloom and Ulrike Schwarz, immersive producers (Jane Ira Bloom)
 Tuvayhun — Beatitudes For a Wounded World
 Morten Lindberg, immersive mix engineer; Morten Lindberg, immersive mastering engineer; Morten Lindberg, immersive producer (Nidarosdomens Jentekor andTrondheim Soloists)

Best Engineered Album, Classical
 Bates: Philharmonia Fantastique - The Making of the Orchestra
 Shawn Murphy, Charlie Post and Gary Rydstrom, engineers; Michael Romanowski, mastering engineer (Edwin Outwater and Chicago Symphony Orchestra)
 Beethoven: Symphony No. 6; Stucky: Silent Spring
 Mark Donahue, engineer; Mark Donahue, mastering engineer (Manfred Honeck and Pittsburgh Symphony Orchestra)
 Perspectives
 Jonathan Lackey, Bill Maylone and Dan Nichols, engineers; Joe Lambert, mastering engineer (Third Coast Percussion)
 Tuvayhun - Beatitudes for a Wounded World
 Morten Lindberg, engineer; Morten Lindberg, mastering engineer (Anita Brevik, Nidarosdomens Jentekor and Trondheim Soloists)
 Williams: Violin Concerto No. 2 & Selected Film Themes
 Bernhard Güttler, Shawn Murphy and Nick Squire, engineers; Christoph Stickel, mastering engineer (Anne-Sophie Mutter, John Williams and Boston Symphony Orchestra)

Producer of the Year, Classical
 Judith Sherman
 Akiho: Oculus (Various Artists) (A)
 Bach, C.P.E.: Sonatas & Rondos (Marc-André Hamelin) (A)
 Bolcom: The Complete Rags (Marc-André Hamelin) (A)
 Felix & Fanny Mendelssohn: String Quartets (Takács Quartet) (A)
 Huang Ro's A Dust in Time (Del Sol Quartet) (A)
 It Feels Like (Eunbi Kim) (A)
 León: Teclas de Mi Piano (Adam Kent) (A)
 Violin Odyssey (Itamar Zorman and Ieva Jokubaviciute) (A)
 Works By Florence Price, Jessie Montgomery, Valerie Coleman (Michael Repper and New York Youth Symphony) (A)
 Jonathan Allen
 Aspire (Seunghee Lee, JP Jofre, Enrico Fagone and London Symphony Orchestra) (A)
 Cooper: Continuum (Jessica Cottis, Adjoah Andoh, Clio Gould and the Oculus Ensemble) (A)
 Muse (Sheku Kanneh-Mason and Isata Kanneh-Mason) (A)
 Origins (Lucie Horsch) (A)
 Saudade (Plinio Fernandes) (A)
 Schubert: Winterreise (Benjamin Appl) (A)
 Secret Love Letters (Lisa Batiashvili, Yannick Nézet-Séguin and Philadelphia Orchestra) (A)
 Song (Sheku Kanneh-Mason) (A)
 Christoph Franke
 Brahms & Berg: Violin Concertos (Christian Tetzlaff, Robin Ticciati and Deutsches Symphonie-Orchester Berlin) (A)
 John Williams - The Berlin Concert (John Williams and Berliner Philharmoniker) (A)
 Mendelssohn: Piano Concertos (Lars Vogt and the Orchestre de chambre de Paris) (A)
 Mozart: Complete Piano Sonatas (Elisabeth Leonskaja) (A)
 Mozart Y Mambo: Cuban Dances (Sarah Willis, José Antonio Méndez Padrón and Havana Lyceum Orchestra) (A)
 James Ginsburg
 As We Are (Julian Velasco) (A)
 Avant L'Orage - French String Trios (Black Oak Ensemble) (A)
 Gems from Armenia (Aznavoorian Duo) (A)
 Stephenson: Symphony No. 3, 'Visions (Vladimir Kulenovic and Lake Forest Symphony) (A)
 Trios from Contemporary Chicago (Lincoln Trio) (A)
 When There Are No Words - Revolutionary Works for Oboe and Piano (Alex Klein and Phillip Bush) (A)
 Elaine Martone
 Beethoven: The Last Sonatas (Gerardo Teissonnière) (A)
 Big Things (Icarus Quartet) (A)
 Perspectives (Third Coast Percussion) (A)
 Schnittke: Concerto for Piano and Strings; Prokofiev: Symphony No. 2 (Yefim Bronfman, Franz Welser-Möst and the Cleveland Orchestra) (A)
 Strauss: Three Tone Poems (Franz Welser-Möst and the Cleveland Orchestra) (A)
 Upon Further Reflection (John Wilson) (A)

SongwritingSongwriter of the Year, Non-ClassicalPerformers names appear in parentheses.
 Tobias Jesso Jr. Boyfriends (Harry Styles) (T)
 Can I Get It (Adele) (T)
 Careless (FKA Twigs featuring Daniel Caesar) (T)
 C'mon Baby Cry (Orville Peck) (T)
 Dotted Lines (King Princess) (T)
 Let You Go (Diplo With TSHA featuring Kareen Lomax) (S)
 No Good Reason (Omar Apollo) (T)
 Thank You Song (FKA Twigs) (T)
 To Be Loved (Adele) (T)
 Amy Allen
 For My Friends (King Princess) (S)
 The Hardest Part (Alexander 23) (S)
 If We Were A Party (Alexander 23) (S)
 If You Love Me (Lizzo) (T)
 Magic Wand (Alexander 23) (T)
 Matilda (Harry Styles) (T)
 Move Me (Charli XCX) (T)
 Too Bad (King Princess) (S)
 Vicious (Sabrina Carpenter) (S)
 Nija Charles
 Cozy (Beyoncé) (T)
 Ex For A Reason (Summer Walker With JT from City Girls) (T)
 Good Love (City Girls featuring Usher) (S)
 IYKYK (Lil Durk featuring Ella Mai and A Boogie wit da Hoodie) (T)
 Lobby (Anitta and Missy Elliott) (S)
 Ride For You (Meek Mill featuring Kehlani) (T)
 Sweetest Pie (Megan Thee Stallion and Dua Lipa) (S)
 Tangerine (Kehlani) (T)
 Throw It Away (Summer Walker) (T)
 The-Dream
 Break My Soul (Beyoncé) (S)
 Church Girl (Beyoncé) (T)
 Energy (Beyoncé featuring Beam) (T)
 I'm That Girl (Beyoncé) (T)
 Mercedes (Brent Faiyaz) (S)
 Rock N Roll (Pusha T featuring Kanye West and Kid Cudi) (T)
 Rolling Stone (Brent Faiyaz) (T)
 Summer Renaissance (Beyoncé) (T)
 Thique (Beyoncé) (T)
 Laura Veltz
 Background Music (Maren Morris) (T)
 Feed (Demi Lovato) (T)
 Humble Quest (Maren Morris) (T)
 Pain (Ingrid Andress) (T)
 29 (Demi Lovato) (T)

ClassicalBest Orchestral Performance "Works by Florence Price, Jessie Montgomery, Valerie Coleman" New York Youth Symphony and Michael Repper "John Williams: The Berlin Concert"
 Berlin Philharmonic and John Williams
 "Dvořák: Symphonies Nos. 7-9"
 Los Angeles Philharmonic and Gustavo Dudamel
 "Sila: The Breath of the World"
 Various Artists
 "Stay on It"
 Wild Up and Christopher RountreeBest Opera Recording Blanchard: Fire Shut Up In My BonesYannick Nézet-Séguin, conductor; Angel Blue, Will Liverman, Latonia Moore and Walter Russell III; David Frost, producer (The Metropolitan Opera Orchestra; The Metropolitan Opera Chorus) Aucoin: Eurydice  
Yannick Nézet-Séguin, conductor; Barry Banks, Nathan Berg, Joshua Hopkins, Erin Morley and Jakub Józef Orliński; David Frost, producer (The Metropolitan Opera Orchestra; The Metropolitan Opera Chorus)
 Davis: X - The Life And Times Of Malcolm X  
Gil Rose, conductor; Ronnita Miller, Whitney Morrison, Victor Robertson and Davóne Tines; Gil Rose, producer (Boston Modern Orchestra Project; Odyssey Opera Chorus)Best Choral Performance BornDonald Nally, conductor (Dominic German, Maren Montalbano, Rebecca Myers and James Reese; The Crossing) Bach: St. John Passion  
John Eliot Gardiner, conductor (English Baroque Soloists; Monteverdi Choir)
 Verdi: Requiem - The Met Remembers 9/11  
Yannick Nézet-Séguin, conductor; Donald Palumbo, chorus master (Michelle DeYoung, Eric Owens, Ailyn Pérez and Matthew Polenzani; The Metropolitan Opera Orchestra; The Metropolitan Opera Chorus)Best Chamber Music/Small Ensemble Performance Shaw: Evergreen – Attacca Quartet Beethoven: Complete String Quartets, Volume 2 - The Middle Quartets – Dover Quartet
 Musical Remembrances – Neave Trio
 Perspectives – Third Coast Percussion
 What Is American – PUBLIQuartetBest Classical Instrumental Solo Letters For The Future – Time for Three; Xian Zhang, conductor (The Philadelphia Orchestra) Abels: Isolation Variation – Hilary Hahn
 Bach: The Art Of Life – Daniil Trifonov
 Beethoven: Diabelli Variations – Mitsuko Uchida
 A Night In Upper Town - The Music Of Zoran Krajacic – Mak GrgićBest Classical Solo Vocal Album Voice Of Nature - The Anthropocene  Renée Fleming, soloist; Yannick Nézet-Séguin, pianist Eden  
Joyce DiDonato, soloist; Maxim Emelyanychev, conductor (Il Pomo D'Oro)
 How Do I Find You  
Sasha Cooke, soloist; Kirill Kuzmin, pianist
 Okpebholo: Lord, How Come Me Here?  
Will Liverman, soloist; Paul Sánchez, pianist (J'Nai Bridges and Caen Thomason-Redus)
 Stranger - Works For Tenor By Nico Muhly  
Nicholas Phan, soloist (Eric Jacobson; Brooklyn Rider and The Knights; Reginald Mobley)Best Classical Compendium An Adoption Story Starr Parodi and Kitt Wakeley; Jeff Fair, Starr Parodi and Kitt Wakeley, producers Aspire  
JP Jofre and Seunghee Lee; Enrico Fagone, conductor; Jonathan Allen, producer
 A Concert For Ukraine  
Yannick Nézet-Séguin, conductor; David Frost, producer
 The Lost Birds  
Voces8; Barnaby Smith and Christopher Tin, conductors; Sean Patrick Flahaven and Christopher Tin, producersBest Contemporary Classical Composition Puts: Contact  Kevin Puts, composer (Xian Zhang, Time for Three and the Philadelphia Orchestra) Akiho: Ligneous Suite  Andy Akiho, composer (Ian Rosenbaum and Dover Quartet)
 Bermel: Intonations  Derek Bermel, composer (Jack Quartet)
 Gubaidulina: The Wrath Of God  Sofia Gubaidulina, composer (Andris Nelsons and Gewandhausorchester)
 Simon: Requiem For The Enslaved  Carlos Simon, composer (Carlos Simon, MK Zulu, Marco Pavé and Hub New Music)

Music video and filmBest Music Video All Too Well: The Short Film – Taylor Swift Taylor Swift, video director; Saul Germaine, video producer "Easy on Me" – Adele
 Xavier Dolan, video director; Xavier Dolan and Nancy Grant, video producers
 "Yet to Come" – BTS
 Yong Seok Choi, video director; Tiffany Suh, video producer
 "Woman" – Doja Cat
 Child., video director; Missy Galanida, Sam Houston, Michelle Larkin and Isaac Rice, video producers
 "The Heart Part 5" – Kendrick Lamar
 Dave Free and Kendrick Lamar, video directors; Jason Baum and Jamie Rabineau, video producers
 "As It Was" – Harry Styles
 Tanu Muino, video director; Frank Borin, Ivanna Borin, Fred Bonham Carter and Alexa Haywood, video producersBest Music Film Jazz Fest: A New Orleans Story – Various artists Frank Marshall and Ryan Suffern, video directors; Frank Marshall, Sean Stuart and Ryan Suffern, video producers'''
 Adele One Night Only – Adele
 Paul Dugdale, video director
 Our World – Justin Bieber
 Michael D. Ratner, video director; Kfir Goldberg, Andy Mininger and Scott Ratner, video producers
 Billie Eilish Live at the O2 – Billie Eilish
 Sam Wrench, video director; Michelle An, Tom Colbourne, Chelsea Dodson and Billie Eilish, video producers
 Motomami (Rosalía TikTok Live Performance) – Rosalía
 Ferrán Echegaray, Rosalía Vila Tobella and Stillz, video directors
 A Band A Brotherhood A Barn – Neil Young and Crazy Horse
 Dhlovelife, video director; Gary Ward, video producer

Special merit awards
MusiCares Person of the Year
 Berry Gordy
 Smokey Robinson

Lifetime Achievement Awards
 The Supremes
 Nirvana
 Ma Rainey
 Nile Rodgers
 Ann Wilson and Nancy Wilson
 Bobby McFerrin
 Slick Rick

Dr. Dre Global Impact Award
 Dr. Dre

Best Song for Social Change
 "Baraye" – Shervin Hajipour

Multiple nominations and awards
The following received multiple nominations:Nine:BeyoncéEight:Kendrick LamarSeven:Adele
Brandi CarlileSix:Mary J. Blige
Future
DJ Khaled
Randy Merrill
Harry Styles
The-DreamFive:Doja Cat
Lucky Daye
Şerban Ghenea
Jay-Z
Lizzo
Maverick City Music
Yannick Nézet-SéguinFour:ABBA
Beach Noise (Jake Kosich, Johnny Kosich, Matt Schaeffer)
Boi-1da
D'Mile
Drake
Tom Elmhirst
H.E.R.
Kid Harpoon
Jeremy Hatcher
Steve Lacy
Miranda Lambert
Emerson Mancini
Manny Marroquin
Ozzy Osbourne
Bonnie Raitt
Christopher "Tricky" Stewart
Taylor SwiftThree:Amy Allen
John Beasley
Bryce Bordone
Bad Bunny
BTS
Coldplay
Luke Combs
DOE
Kirk Franklin
David Frost
Phil Hanseroth
Tim Hanseroth
Jack Harlow
Jens Christian Isaksen
Tobias Jesso Jr.
Tyler Johnson
Greg Kurstin
John Legend
Colin Leonard
Lil Wayne
Morten Lindberg
Muni Long
Lucius
Max Martin
Maren Morris
PJ Morton
Willie Nelson
Nova Wav (Brittany "Chi" Coney, Denisia "Blu June" Andrews)
Aoife O'Donovan
Robert Plant
Rick Ross
Blake Slatkin
Jazmine Sullivan
Tems
Turnstile
Wet Leg
Stuart WhiteTwo:Rauw Alejandro
Brandon Bell
Big Thief
Rob Bisel
The Black Keys
BloodPop
Blxst
Bonobo
Mike Bozzi
Ray Charles Brown Jr.
Julian Burg
Burna Boy
Nija Charles
Dave Cobb
Jacob Collier
Madison Cunningham
Dahi
Diplo
Domi & JD Beck
Billie Eilish
Björn Engelmann
Lady Gaga
Gunna
Brandon Harding
Michael Harris
Sam Holland
James Hunt
Idles
Michael Ilbert
Shooter Jennings
Samara Joy
Patrick Kehrier
Pat Kelly
Angelique Kidjo
Alison Krauss
Latto
Bernard Löhr
Pete Lyman
Bill Malina
Ashley McBryde
Chris McLaughlin
Lin-Manuel Miranda
Anderson .Paak
Dolly Parton
Ricky Reed
Amanda Reifer
Morten Ristorp
Nile Rodgers
Rosalía
Rüfüs Du Sol
Raphael Saadiq
Anoushka Shankar
Chad Smith
Spike Stent
Chris Tomlin
Tye Tribbett
Johnathan Turner
Molly Tuttle
Phil Wickham
Sammy Witte
Yeah Yeah Yeahs
Young Thug
Hans Zimmer

The following received multiple awards:Four:Beyoncé
Maverick City MusicThree:Brandi Carlile
Kirk Franklin
Kendrick Lamar
Bonnie RaittTwo:''
Jeremy Hatcher
Tobias Jesso Jr.
Samara Joy
Randy Merrill
Willie Nelson
Yannick Nézet-Séguin
Ozzy Osbourne
Harry Styles
The-Dream
Wet Leg

In memoriam
The show honored artists and industry professionals that had died within the last year.
	

Loretta Lynn
Olivia Newton-John
Thom Bell
Jeff Beck
Ramsey Lewis
Jerry Allison
Dino Danelli
Pharoah Sanders
Ian McDonald
Keith Levene
Alec John Such
Fred E. White
Andrew Woolfolk
Takeoff
Anita Pointer
Coolio
DJ Kay Slay
Irene Cara
Donald Shaw
Tyrone Downie
Hurricane G
David Crosby
Ronnie Hawkins
Sam Gooden
Andrew Fletcher
Jim Seals
Vangelis
Christine McVie
Lisa Marie Presley
Gal Costa
Bobby Rydell
Jerry Lee Lewis
Yukihiro Takahashi
Jeff Cook
Lamont Dozier

References

External links
 

 065
2023 in American music
2023 in Los Angeles
Grammy
February 2023 events in the United States
2023 awards in the United States